Teratopodus (meaning "monstrous foot") is an ichnogenus of titanosaurian sauropod footprint. It includes a single species, T. malarguensis, known from prints found in the Late Cretaceous Anacleto Formation of Argentina. The Teratopodus tracks represent some of the best sauropod pes tracks currently known from South America.

Description 
Analysis of the fossils shows that the dinosaurs walked from an area of humid ground to a more flooded area.

Paleoenvironment 

Several titanosaurs are known from the Anacleto Formation, including Pitekunsaurus, Narambuenatitan, Barrosasaurus, and Neuquensaurus. One of these dinosaurs potentially could have made the Teratopodus prints. Remains of the ornithopod Gasparinisaura and the theropods Abelisaurus and Aucasaurus have also been recovered from the formation.

See also 

 List of dinosaur ichnogenera

References 

Dinosaur trace fossils
Fossil trackways
Fossil taxa described in 2022